Sardar Aurangzeb Nalota is a Pakistani politician from the province of Khyber Pakhtunkhwa. He had been a member of the Provincial Assembly of Khyber Pakhtunkhwa from 2008 to May 2018 and from August 2018 to January 2023.

Early life and education
He was born on 4 June 1961 in Abbottabad District.

He has a Bachelors of Arts degree.

Political career
He ran for the seat of the Provincial Assembly of the North-West Frontier Province as a candidate of Pakistan Muslim League (N) (PML-N) from Constituency PF-47 (Abbottabad-IV) in 2002 Pakistani general election but was unsuccessful. He received 12,434 votes and lost the seat to Nisar Safdar Khan, a candidate of Pakistan Muslim League (Q) (PML-Q).

He was elected to the Provincial Assembly of the North-West Frontier Province as a candidate of PML-N from Constituency PF-47 (Abbottabad-IV) in 2008 Pakistani general election. He received 18,377 votes and defeated Ijaz Zar Khan Jadoon, an independent candidate.

He was re-elected to the Provincial Assembly of Khyber Pakhtunkhwa as a candidate of PML-N from Constituency PK-47 (Abbottabad-IV) in 2013 Pakistani general election. He received 25,797 votes and defeated a candidate of Pakistan Tehreek-e-Insaf.

He was re-elected to Provincial Assembly of Khyber Pakhtunkhwa as a candidate of PML-N from Constituency PK-37 (Abbottabad-II) in 2018 Pakistani general election.

References

Living people
Khyber Pakhtunkhwa MPAs 2013–2018
1961 births
Pakistan Muslim League (N) MPAs (Khyber Pakhtunkhwa)
Khyber Pakhtunkhwa MPAs 2008–2013
Khyber Pakhtunkhwa MPAs 2018–2023